Cengiz Kavaklıoğlu (born 11 September 1968) is a retired Turkish athlete who specialised in sprinting events. He represented his country at the 1991 and 1993 World Indoor Championships. In addition he won a bronze medal at the 1991 Mediterranean Games.

Competition record

Personal bests
Outdoor
100 metres – 10.41 (+1.9 m/s, Athens 1991)
Indoor
60 metres – 6.74 (Seville 1991)
200 metres – 21.93 (Genoa 1992)

References

All-Athletics profile

1968 births
Living people
Turkish male sprinters
Mediterranean Games bronze medalists for Turkey
Mediterranean Games medalists in athletics
Athletes (track and field) at the 1991 Mediterranean Games
20th-century Turkish people